The Victory Tests were a series of cricket matches played in England from 19 May to 22 August 1945, between a combined Australian Services XI and an English national side. The first match began less than two weeks after the end of World War II in Europe, and the matches were embraced by the public of England as a way to get back to their way of life from before the war.

The matches are known as the "Victory Tests", but they were never given Test match status by the participating Boards of Control, because the Australian Cricket Board feared their side was not strong enough to compete with a near Test-strength England, so the games only had first class status.

In all, the teams played five three-day matches, two of which were won by each side with one drawn. 367,000 people attended the matches at Lord's (three matches), Old Trafford and Bramall Lane (one each), with the final game at Lord's attracting a then-record 93,000 people for a single three-day match.

Australian Services XI

The Australian side was an amalgam of an RAAF XI, which had already been stationed in England during the war, and another group of mostly AIF soldiers from Australia. The players were deliberately stationed with each other in England for the express purpose of forming a cricket team to tour the country, with Australian prime minister John Curtin pushing for the immediate resumption of international cricket after the war was over. The team was officially a military unit, commanded by Squadron Leader Stan Sismey, the team's wicket-keeper. Lindsay Hassett was the on-field captain.

Only one player in the side, future Test captain Lindsay Hassett, had any previous Test match experience, and the rest of the side was made up mostly of Australian Sheffield Shield players. Keith Miller, at the time only considered a promising batsman with Victoria, played what many consider to be his 'breakout' series in the Victory Tests, ensuring that when he returned to Australia he would have a place in the Australian national team now referred to as The Invincibles.

Graham Williams, the team's main strike bowler, had only been released from a German prisoner of war camp weeks before the series started, and played at 31 kg (68 lb) below his pre-war playing weight. In between overs he drank glasses of glucose and water to keep his energy up, but when he was unable to bowl Miller took his place.

The Australian team, despite being split by rank and service, all took their place in the side in good spirit and not much was made of the fact that Hassett, a warrant officer who was outranked by almost every other member of the team, was appointed captain.

English side

The English side's batting line-up was strong enough to be considered Test-strength, with players like Len Hutton, Wally Hammond, Les Ames, Bill Edrich and Cyril Washbrook, all of whom played Test cricket for England. Hutton held the record for the highest individual Test innings at the time with the 364 that he scored against Australia in 1938, and Hammond boasted 7,249 Test runs at an average of 58.45 over his career, despite being over 40 by the time the Victory Tests were played.

But although the English batting side was far superior to the Australians, they only managed to score over 300 runs in one innings for the entire Victory Test tour.

Their bowling was seen as their weakness, and indeed a lot of changes were made to the bowling attack throughout the series. It worked for the last match of the series, when Australia were kept to under 250 runs in both of their innings, but none of the bowlers – bar seam bowler Dick Pollard, who took 25 wickets in his four matches – were very consistent, or indeed selected with any regularity. George Pope took eight wickets in the second match, only to miss the third, and then came back to take six in the fourth match.

Series summary
The series was drawn 2-2, with one match drawn.

First match

Second match

Third match

Fourth match

Fifth match

After the Victory Tests
Following on from the success of the tour of England, the Australian Services XI traveled through India and Sri Lanka (then Ceylon) for four months at the request of Australian external affairs minister Dr H.V. Evatt, before returning to Australia to play against Sheffield Shield state sides. The gruelling schedule resulted in many players in the Services side playing well below their capabilities, and by the time they were back in Australia they were routinely beaten easily by the local teams.

However, the importance of the Victory Test tour as a whole cannot be understated, because it helped people get back to their normal lives after the war, and unearthed some of the great cricketers of the time.

See also
Australian Imperial Forces cricket team
1945 English cricket season

References 

 Wilson, Neil (30 July 2005). "Out of the Ashes". weekend, p. 8.
 Australian Services in England 1945 scorecards on CricketArchive
 "The Sports Factor" report, from Radio National

External links
  Forgotten Heroes: The 1945 Australian Services Cricket Team,  Ed Jaggard, Sporting Traditions, May 1996 (PDF)

History of Test cricket
Aftermath of World War II in the United Kingdom
1945 in English cricket